The 1962 Georgia gubernatorial election was held on November 6, 1962.

Carl Sanders won the Democratic primary on September 12 with 58.07% of the vote, defeating former Governor Marvin Griffin. At this time, Georgia was a one-party state, and the Democratic nomination was tantamount to victory. Sanders won the November general election without an opponent.

This election was notable for a number of reasons. First, it was the last Georgia gubernatorial election to date where the Republican Party did not field a candidate.  Second, the primary election was the first that took place under a winner-take-all system, as the previously used County Unit System had been struck down by the US Supreme Court in Gray v. Sanders.  Finally, upon election, Carl Sanders became the youngest governor of a state at the time (aged 37) and the first governor from an urban area since the 1920s. He beat former Governor Marvin Griffin in the Democratic primary.

Democratic primary

Candidates
Marvin Griffin, former Governor of Georgia (1955–59)
 Cecil L. Langham
 Hoke O'Kelley, perennial candidate
Carl Sanders, State Senator from Augusta and President pro tempore of the Georgia Senate
 Grace Wilkey Thomas, candidate for Governor in 1954 and desegregationist

Results

General election results

References

1962
Gubernatorial
Georgia
November 1962 events in the United States